"Touchin, Lovin" is a song by American singer Trey Songz, taken from his sixth studio album, Trigga (2014). The song features production from The Featherstones and a guest verse from Nicki Minaj. This is their second collaboration, the first being Bottoms Up. The song interpolates The Notorious B.I.G. and R. Kelly's song "Fuck You Tonight". It was released on September 9, 2014 as the sixth official single from Trigga.

Music video
The music video directed by Jason Zada was released on December 1, 2014. The video shows Trey Songz in the font of black background. Fans are allowed to click several symbols with different interaction effect of Trey and the girls.

The video began with Trey waking up from his bed and was offered two pills by a woman. If the red pill was chosen, a red-clad woman will come out of a red rose. If the blue pill was chosen, a woman with a white furry cloak will come out of a frozen tree. The next option is between a burning ice and a mirror. If the burning ice was chosen, two girls, one with red body paint and flames around her body, the other one with blue body paint, will approach Trey. If the mirror was chosen. A woman in a black bikini will come out, the woman will slowly disappear in shadow. The third option is between a blue scarf and a diamond. If the scarf was chosen, a blond girl will come out and lip-sync the lyrics. If the diamond was chosen, a woman in a shiny diamond dress will come out. Nicki Minaj's part began with her sitting on a throne with a cane, and a few scene with Trey. The last option is between a withered tree with two snakes on top of it and a flock of butterfly. If the tree was chosen, a snake-dancer with a helmet will appear and seduce Trey with dances and snakes. If the butterfly flock was chosen, a girl will come out and summon a flock of butterfly towards Trey. The video ends with Trey waking up from a dream.

Track listing

Charts

Weekly charts

Year-end charts

Certifications

Release history

References

2014 singles
2014 songs
Trey Songz songs
Nicki Minaj songs
Songs written by Nicki Minaj
Songs written by Trey Songz
Atlantic Records singles